Gregory is a Legislative Assembly of Queensland electoral district in Queensland, Australia.

Members for Gregory

Election results

See also
 Politics of Australia

References

External links
 

Gregory